This is a list of African-American newspapers that have been published in Michigan.  It includes both current and historical newspapers.  The first known such newspaper in Michigan was The Venture of 1879, followed in 1883 by the Detroit Plaindealer.

Newspapers

See also 
List of African-American newspapers and media outlets
List of African-American newspapers in Indiana
List of African-American newspapers in Ohio
List of African-American newspapers in Wisconsin
List of newspapers in Michigan

Works cited

References 

Newspapers
Michigan
African-American
African-American newspapers